The Independent Schools Athletic League (ISAL) is a sports league for independent high schools in New York state.

Member schools
All schools are within the New York City borough of Manhattan unless otherwise noted.
Bay Ridge Preparatory School in Bay Ridge, Brooklyn
Birch Wathen Lenox School
Brooklyn Friends School in Downtown Brooklyn
Browning School
Calhoun School
Churchill School and Center
Columbia Grammar and Preparatory School
Dwight School
French-American School of New York in Scarsdale, Larchmont, and Mamaroneck, New York
Garden School in Jackson Heights, Queens
Little Red School House and Elisabeth Irwin High School
Loyola School
Lycée Français de New York
Rudolf Steiner School
St. Hilda's & St. Hughes
Trevor Day School
United Nations International School
Winston Preparatory School (Manhattan campus)
York Preparatory School

Associate Members
Staten Island Academy in Staten Island, New York
Winston Preparatory School (Norwalk, Connecticut campus)

See also
The following independent school sport leagues are also in New York state:
GISAL - Girls Independent Schools Athletic League
NYSAISAA - New York State Association of Independent Schools Athletic Association
PSAA - Private School Athletic Association

External links
 Official site

High school sports associations in the United States